EDTF may refer to:

 e-Learning Developers’ Task Force, predecessor of E-Learning Developers' Community of Practice (ELCoP)
 EVA Development Flight Tests (EDTF-5), of STS-80
 Exam Development Task Forces, of the American Registry for Diagnostic Medical Sonography
 Extended Date Time Format, a type of extended date formats added to ISO 8601 in 2019
 Freiburg Airport, Baden-Württemberg, Germany